Huruiyeh (also Romanized as Ḩūrū’īyeh; also known as Ḩūroeeyeh) is a village in Nowdezh Rural District, Aseminun District, Manujan County, Kerman Province, Iran. At the 2006 census, its population was 74, in 14 families.

References 

Populated places in Manujan County